Muse Records was a jazz record company and label founded in New York City by Joe Fields in 1972.

Fields worked as an executive for Prestige Records in the 1960s. Several of the albums were previously released on Cobblestone Records. Muse also had another label, Onyx Records, which operated until 1978, when Fields and collaborator Don Schlitten ended their professional relationship.

In the late 1970s, Muse partnered with the Dutch Timeless Records to distribute Timeless Muse.

Muse was sold in 1996 to 32 Jazz, which repackaged and reissued a large amount of Muse recordings. In 2003, Savoy Jazz (which had become a subsidiary of Nippon Columbia) acquired the rights to the Muse catalog (along with that of Landmark) from 32 Jazz.

Fields later founded HighNote Records and Savant Records; many Muse artists later recorded for these labels as well.

Discography
From 1972 until 1995 Muse released around 500 albums.

See also
 List of record labels

References

External links
 
 Muse Records discography at jazzlists.com

American record labels
Jazz record labels
Pop record labels
Record labels established in 1972
Record labels disestablished in 1997